Louis-Aimé d'Auvigny (about 1738, in Paris - after 1795, in Tulchyn, Poland, now Ukraine) was an 18th-century French dancer, ballet master, choreographer and dance teacher. His name was also recorded as: Dauvigny and D’Auvigne, D’Auvigni, D’auvigny, d’Avigny, Dauvigni, Davigni, Davigny, Douigny, Douvigny, Dovigny, Dovini, Dovinié, Dowini, Dowinni; and in Poland he was given Polish first name Ludwik. Probably the son of a writer and historian Aymé-Jean Chabaille d'Auvigny de Morinval called Jean Du Castre d'Auvigny, step brother of dancer and dance teacher Nicolas-François-Hyacinthe Dubus, known by his stage name Hyacinthe, and of the comic actors Gabriel-Éléonor-Hervé Dubus, whose stage name was Soli (Sauly), and Pierre-Louis Dubus whose stage name was Préville. His mother was their sister Louise-Élisabeth Dubus (marriage 1737).

Artistic career 
After he made his debut in the ballet of the Comédie-Italienne in 1753 and of the Comédie-Française in 1755 (two years after Préville), D'Auvigny spent some years in Lyon where he danced with Jean-Georges Noverre. In 1760, the latter called him to the court of Stuttgart and gradually entrusted him with the responsibility of ballet.

In Stuttgart he married dancer Marie Claudine Toscani (1746-1768) on 6 March 1764, the daughter of Italian comedians: Giovanni Battista Toscani and Isabella Gafforia.

When Noverre left in 1767, D'Auvigny was appointed ballet master and kept this position until Easter 1771. In 1770, he set among others the ballets of Calliroe, tragédie en musique by Antonio Sacchini presented at the theatre of Ludwigsburg Palace. In July 1772 he danced in Paris. In the winter and spring 1772/1773 he was a ballet master at the King's Theater on Haymarket in London.

Choreographic works 
In Palace Theater, Ludwigsburg
 1768: Three ballets, music by Florian Johann Deller (in Niccolo Jommelli's Fetonte)
 1768: Il matrimonio improviso, music by Florian Johann Deller (in Niccolo Jommelli's La schiava liberata)
 1768: Le astuzie della fata Urgela, music by Florian Johann Deller (in Niccolo Jommelli's La schiava liberata)
 1770: Ballo allegorico, music by Florian Johann Deller (in Antonio Sacchini's Calliroe)
In Castle Solitude
 1770: La constance, music by Florian Johann Deller (in Antonio Beroni's L’amore in musica)
 1770: Ballo polacco, music by Florian Johann Deller (in Antonio Beroni's L’amore in musica)
In King's Theatre in the Haymarket, London
 1773: Grand Serious Ballet in Antonio Sacchini's Il Cid 
 1773: Grand Chaconne in Antonio Sacchini's Il Cid
 1773: Pastoral Dance in Antonio Sacchini's Il Cid
 1773: L’Isle désert in Antonio Sacchini's Il Cid
 1773: Apollo and Venus in Gaetano Pugnani's Apollo et Issea
 1773: La Fête du Village in Gaetano Pugnani's Apollo et Issea
 1773: Les Sauvages in Gaetano Pugnani's Apollo et Issea
 1773: Les Tartares in Antonio Sacchini's Tamerlano
 1773: Grand Ballet in Christoph Willibald Gluck's Orfeo ed Euridice

Dancing-master in Poland 
In December 1773 he danced at the Royal Opera of Versailles, There he met the Polish prince Adam Kazimierz Czartoryski and his wife Izabela, who offered him a job in Poland. He became a dance teacher at Warsaw in Nobles' Academy of the Corps of Cadets (1774-1794) and a private teacher of the children of the Czartoryski princes in their residences in Warsaw (in the Blue Palace), in Powązki near Warsaw (Izabela Czartoryska's summer residence, modeled on Marie Antoinette's Hameau de la Reine) and sometimes at the Czartoryski Palace in Puławy. From 1795 he worked as a dance teacher in the residence of count Stanisław Szczęsny Potocki in Tulchyn.

D'Auvigny's death belongs to Julian Ursyn Niemcewicz's pen: "already advanced in years, a resident of Tulchyn, he took a young wife, and died on his wedding night – a harsh lesson", Niemcewicz comments, "for old men".

He was the father of painter-miniaturist Charles (Carl, Karol) d'Auvigny (1 September 1765, Ludwigsburg - 4 February 1830, Warsaw).

References

See also 
 Troupe of the Comédie-Française in 1755

Year of death missing
18th-century French dancers
French choreographers
French ballet masters
Historical dance
Troupe of the Comédie-Française
Dancers from Paris
Year of birth uncertain
French male ballet dancers